Jean-Pierre Alain Jabouille (1 October 1942 – 2 February 2023) was a French racing driver. He raced in 55 Formula One Grands Prix, collecting two wins during the first years of Renault's turbocharged programme in the late 1970s and early 1980s. Jabouille also raced the 24 Hours of Le Mans from the late 1960s to the early 1990s, driving for Alpine, Matra, Sauber, and Peugeot and collecting four 3rd overall finishes in 1973, 1974, 1992, and 1993. Jabouille was one of the last of a breed of Formula One drivers who were also engineers.

Career

Jabouille first made his mark in French Formula Three in 1967, and continued in 1968, maintaining the car himself on his way to the runner up spot behind François Cevert. For 1969 he was contracted as a development driver by Alpine, having several disjointed runs in Formula Two and sports cars. In 1973, he co-drove a Matra to 3rd at the Le Mans 24 Hours, and repeated this feat in 1974, when he also won the Formula neo race at Hockenheim, and finished as runner-up in the European 2-litre series for Alpine. He also made his first appearances in Formula One, failing to qualify an Iso–Marlboro at the French Grand Prix, and a Surtees at the Austrian Grand Prix.

1975 saw Jabouille sever his ties with Alpine, and gain Elf backing to make his own Formula Two chassis. He finished runner-up to Jacques Laffite, but finally made his full Grand Prix debut, finishing 12th in a works Tyrrell at the French Grand Prix. For 1976 he concentrated on Formula Two, finally winning the title.

Formula One
Jabouille was signed up by Formula One team Renault to develop their new 1.5l turbocharged engine for 1977. The RS01 car debuted at the 1977 British Grand Prix, but initially the turbo engine (a first for Formula One) was fragile and suffered from severe turbo lag, making it difficult to drive on tight circuits. However, Jabouille, who was an engineer by trade persevered and developed the RS01 throughout, recording several notable qualifying positions in 1978, and landed the marque's first points with 4th place at the United States Grand Prix East at Watkins Glen, a circuit particularly tough on fuel consumption- one of the Renault turbo's biggest weaknesses.

1979 saw Renault expand to run a second car for René Arnoux. Jabouille secured Renault's first Formula One pole at the South African Grand Prix, and then won their first victory, fittingly at the French Grand Prix, also from pole.  This was the first victory for a turbocharged car in Formula One.  He took two more poles, at the German and Italian Grands Prix, but poor reliability meant the win was his only score.

In 1980 Jabouille took two more poles and another win at the Austrian Grand Prix. However, a suspension failure in the Canadian Grand Prix caused a sizeable accident, which left him with a broken leg, just after he had signed with Ligier for 1981.

His injuries saw him sit out the first two races of the 1981 season, but it soon became clear he wasn't fully fit, failing to qualify for two of his four attempts, at which point he decided to retire from Formula One. Subsequently he stayed with Ligier and became team manager in 1982. In 1984 he transferred to Ligier's joint entry with Curb Racing in the 1984 CART series, as team manager.

Sportscars
Jabouille returned to racing in the mid-1980s, driving in the French Supertouring Championship before joining Peugeot to help develop their sports car programme at the 24 Hours of Le Mans. This culminated in third places for the marque in both the 1992 and 1993 races. In 1994 he succeeded Jean Todt as director of Peugeot Sport, but unsuccessful seasons for Peugeot as engine suppliers in Formula One with McLaren and Jordan saw him sacked in 1995. Following that, he ran his own sports car team in the ISRS.

Death
Jabouille died on 2 February 2023 at the age of 80.

Racing record

Career summary

Complete European Formula Two Championship results
(key) (Races in bold indicate pole position; races in italics indicate fastest lap)

24 Hours of Le Mans results

Complete Formula One results
(key) (Races in bold indicate pole position)

References

External links

1942 births
2023 deaths
French racing drivers
French Formula One drivers
European Formula Two Championship drivers
French Formula Three Championship drivers
Formula One race winners
Racing drivers from Paris
Williams Formula One drivers
Surtees Formula One drivers
Tyrrell Formula One drivers
Renault Formula One drivers
Formula One people
Ligier Formula One drivers
24 Hours of Le Mans drivers
World Sportscar Championship drivers
24 Hours of Spa drivers
Peugeot Sport drivers
Sauber Motorsport drivers